Liu Shan (died 1427) was a general of the Ming dynasty era of Chinese history. The Emperor of China called upon him to lead a massive army to crush the Lam Sơn uprising in Vietnam, led by the landowner Le Loi. After the defeat of the Chinese armed forces at the Battle of Tot Dong, he took command of the Chinese armies outside of the capital city. Liu Shan commanded a 100,000-strong force of Chinese troops to attack the Vietnamese troops to start the Battles of Lang Son and the Red River Valley. Le Loi turned his attention to the main force, Liu Shan's, and quickly annihilated them. Liu Shan was captured, and summarily executed.

Ming dynasty generals
Year of birth missing
1427 deaths
Executed Ming dynasty people
People executed by Vietnam